The Stanley Awards, also known as The Stanleys, are an annual comics award issued by the Australian Cartoonists' Association which recognize the best of Australian cartoonists and cartooning. They are named after Stan Cross and were first organized in November 1985.

The Silver Stanley award is now known as the Jim Russell Award and is awarded to a cartoonist for services to the cartooning industry.

Winners

Gold Stanley
Awarded to the 'Cartoonist of the Year' (currently sponsored by The Herald Sun) and the past winners are:
{| border="1" cellpadding="4" cellspacing="0" style="border:1px solid #aaa; border-collapse:collapse"
|-
!bgcolor="#CCCCCC" |Year
!bgcolor="#CCCCCC" |Cartoonist
|-
| 1985
| Alan Moir
|-
| 1986
| John Spooner
|-
| 1987
| Bill Leak
|-
| 1988
| Bill Leak
|-
| 1989
| Bill Leak
|-
| 1990
| Suzanne White
|-
| 1991
| Bill Leak
|-
| 1992
| Bill Leak
|-
| 1993
| Eric Lobbecke
|-
| 1994
| Bill Leak
|-
| 1995
| Bill Leak
|-
| 1996
| Bill Leak
|-
| 1997
| Brett Lethbridge
|-
| 1998
| Brett Lethbridge
|-
| 1999
| Joanne Brooker
|-
| 2000
| Sturt Krygsman
|-
| 2001
| James Kemsley
|-
| 2002
| David Rowe
|-
| 2003
| Rolf Heimann
|-
| 2004
| George Haddon
|-
| 2005
| Peter Broelman
|-
| 2006
| Mark Knight
|-
| 2007
| David Rowe
|-
| 2008
| David Rowe
|-
| 2009
| Peter Broelman
|-
| 2010
| David Pope
|-
| 2011
| Anton Emdin
|-
| 2012
| David Pope
|-
| 2013
| Anton Emdin
|-
| 2014
| David Rowe
|-
| 2015
| David Rowe
|-
| 2016
| Glen Le Lievre
|}

Jim Russell Award
Formerly the Silver Stanley for Contribution to Australian Black & White Art, this award is made to the individual or organization who in the opinion of the ACA Board has made a significant contribution to Australian cartooning; and the past winners are:
{| border="1" cellpadding="4" cellspacing="0" style="border:1px solid #aaa; border-collapse:collapse"
|-
!bgcolor="#CCCCCC" |Year
!bgcolor="#CCCCCC" |Cartoonist
|-
| 1985
| Jim Russell
|-
| 1986
| The Bulletin
|-
| 1987
| John Thorby
|-
| 1988
| Vane Lindesay
|-
| 1989
| State Library of New South Wales
|-
| 1990
| James Kemsley
|-
| 1991
| Dan Russell
|-
| 1992
| Lindsay Foyle
|-
| 1993
| John Champion/Rotary Club of Coffs Harbour City
|-
| 1993
| John Champion
|-
| 1994
| Les Dixon
|-
| 1995
| Cole Buchanan
|-
| 1996
| Tony Rafty
|-
| 1997
| LJ Hooker
|-
| 1998
| Jeff Hook
|-
| 1999
| Roger Fletcher
|-
| 2000
| Jenny Hughes
|-
| 2001
| Bruce Petty
|-
| 2003
| William 'Weg' Green
|-
| 2004
| Monty Wedd
|-
| 2005
| Allan 'Sols' Salisbury
|-
| 2006
| Paul Rigby
|-
| 2007
| Michael Atchison
|-
| 2008
| Jim Bridges
|-
| 2009
| Norman 'Heth' Hetherington
|-
| 2010
| Steve Panozzo
|-
| 2011
| Rolf Heimann
|-
| 2012
| Talking Pictures
|-
| 2013
| Russ Radcliffe
|-
| 2014
| Media, Entertainment and Arts Alliance
|-
| 2015
| For Gorsake, Stop Laughing, This is Serious!
|-
| 2016
| Gerald Carr
|-
|}

Comic Strip
Awarded to the 'Comic Strip Artist of the Year' (currently sponsored by The Daily Telegraph) and the past winners are:
{| border="1" cellpadding="4" cellspacing="0" style="border:1px solid #aaa; border-collapse:collapse"
|-
!bgcolor="#CCCCCC" |Year
!bgcolor="#CCCCCC" |Comic Artist
|-
| 1985
| Gary Clark
|-
| 1986
| Ken Emerson
|-
| 1987
| Bill Mitchell
|-
| 1988
| Bill Mitchell
|-
| 1989
| Brian Kogler
|-
| 1990
| James Kemsley
|-
| 1991
| Brian Kogler
|-
| 1992
| Brian Kogler
|-
| 1993
| Brian Kogler
|-
| 1994
| Gary Clark
|-
| 1995
| Gary Clark
|-
| 1996
| Gary Clark
|-
| 1997
| Gary Clark
|-
| 1998
| Gary Clark
|-
| 1999
| Gary Clark
|-
| 2000
| Tony Lopes
|-
| 2001
| Tony Lopes
|-
| 2002
| Gary Clark
|-
| 2003
| Sean Leahy
|-
| 2004
| James Kemsley
|-
| 2005
| Tony Lopes
|-
| 2006
| Tony Lopes
|-
| 2007
| Tony Lopes
|-
| 2008
| Tony Lopes
|-
| 2009
| Gary Clark
|-
| 2010
| Tony Lopes
|-
|}

Single Gag
Awarded to the 'Single Gag Cartoonist of the Year' (currently sponsored by The Courier Mail) and the past winners are:
{| border="1" cellpadding="4" cellspacing="0" style="border:1px solid #aaa; border-collapse:collapse"
|-
!bgcolor="#CCCCCC" |Year
!bgcolor="#CCCCCC" |Cartoonist
|-
| 1985
| Eric Jolliffe
|-
| 1986
| Eric Jolliffe
|-
| 1987
| Matthew Martin
|-
| 1988
| Matthew Martin
|-
| 1989
| Brian Kogler
|-
| 1990
| Brian Kogler
|-
| 1991
| Brian Kogler
|-
| 1992
| Brian Kogler
|-
| 1993
| Mark Knight
|-
| 1994
| Cathy Wilcox
|-
| 1995
| Kerry Millard
|-
| 1996
| Glen Le Lievre
|-
| 1997
| Cathy Wilcox
|-
| 1998
| Pat Campbell
|-
| 1999
| Kerry Millard
|-
| 2000
| Mark Lynch
|-
| 2001
| Matt Golding
|-
| 2002
| Tony Lopes
|-
| 2003
| Dean Alston
|-
| 2004
| Pat Campbell
|-
| 2005
| Matt Golding
|-
| 2006
| Matt Golding
|-
| 2007
| Matt Golding
|-
| 2008
| Matt Golding
|-
| 2009
| Matt Golding
|-
| 2010
| Matt Golding
|-
|}

 Illustrator - sponsored by Viscopy: Anton Emdin
 Graphic Media Artist - sponsored by Newmatilda.com: David Follett
 Caricaturist - sponsored by The Australian: John Spooner
 Political/Editorial Cartoonist - sponsored by The Sydney Morning Herald: Peter Broelman

References

 The Stanleys: annual Australian black & white artists' awards

External links
 The Stanleys - from the Australian Cartoonists' Association official website

Cartooning
 
Comics awards
Australian journalism awards
Australian art awards
Awards established in 1985
1985 establishments in Australia